William "Will" Hernandez (born September 2, 1995) is an American football guard for the Arizona Cardinals of the National Football League (NFL). He played college football at UTEP.

College career
After redshirting his first year at UTEP in 2013, Hernandez started all 49 games from 2014 to 2017.  After the 2016 season, Hernandez was a second-team All-American.  After the 2017 season, Hernandez was named to the C-USA first-team.  He was also invited to the College Football All-Star Challenge.

Professional career

New York Giants

The New York Giants selected Hernandez in the second round (34th overall) of the 2018 NFL Draft. Hernandez was the second guard drafted in 2018, behind Notre Dame's Quenton Nelson (sixth overall).

On May 12, 2018, the New York Giants signed Hernandez to a four-year, $7.45 million contract that includes $5.08 million guaranteed and a signing bonus of $3.49 million.

Hernandez was named the Giants starting left guard to start 2018, starting all 16 games and was named to the PFWA All-Rookie Team.

On October 29, 2020, Hernandez was placed on the reserve/COVID-19 list by the Giants after he tested positive for COVID-19. On November 10, he returned to the active roster. However, despite his healthy return, he remained a backup for the remainder of the season, losing the starting left guard position to rookie Shane Lemieux.

Arizona Cardinals
On March 28, 2022, the Arizona Cardinals signed Hernandez to a one-year contract. In Week 4 game against the Carolina Panthers Hernandez was ejected in the fourth quarter for making contact with an official. He was placed on injured reserve on November 9, 2022. He was activated on December 17.

On March 15, 2023, Hernandez signed a two-year contract extension with the Cardinals.

References

External links
twitter
UTEP Miners bio
New York Giants bio

1995 births
Living people
American sportspeople of Mexican descent
Players of American football from Nevada
Sportspeople from Las Vegas
American football offensive guards
UTEP Miners football players
New York Giants players
Arizona Cardinals players